96 hours (original title: 96 heures) is a 2014 French thriller film directed by Frédéric Schoendoerffer.

Plot

After 3 years in prison, Kancel is being transferred for questioning. In transit, he escapes, abducting Captain Carré of the BRB, responsible for putting him behind bars. Kancel has 96 hours to find out who betrayed him and get his revenge.

Cast
 Niels Arestrup as Victor Kancel
 Gérard Lanvin as Gabriel Carré
 Sylvie Testud as Marion Reynaud
 Anne Consigny as Françoise Carré
 Laura Smet as Camille Kancel
 Slimane Dazi as Abdel Koudri
  as Lawyer Francis Castella
 Jochen Hägele as Sacha
  as Joseph
 Jules Balekdjian as Tom
 Maurice Bitsch as Hamon

References

External links

2014 films
2014 thriller films
Films scored by Max Richter
Films about kidnapping in France
2010s French-language films
French thriller films
Films directed by Frédéric Schoendoerffer
2010s French films